Raphaël Faÿs is a French gypsy jazz and classical guitarist and composer born in Paris on 10 December 1959.

Discography 
 Gitarre, spielt Kompositionen von Marcel Dadi (Decca, 1976)
 Raphael Fays (Sonopresse, 1978)
 Gipsy New Horizon (Sonopresse, 1979)
 Night in Caravan (WEA, 1980)
 Vivi Swing (WEA, 1982)
 Bonjour Gipsy (WEA, 1983)
 La Musique de Django (Ariola, 1985)
 Djangology (Carrere, 1987)
 Voyages (Ricordu, 1989)
 Gipsy Touch (Ricordu, 1991)
 Sans Domicile Fixe (GHA, 1996)
 Jazz Hot: The Gipsy Way (Mandala, 2000)
 Guitar Romance (Royal River Music, 2003)
 Swing Guitar (Le Chant du Monde, 2005)
 Andalucia (Le Chant du Monde, 2006)
 Django & Classic (Le Chant du Monde, 2006)
 Django's Works (Le Chant du Monde, 2010)
 Django et Rien D'Autre! (Le Chant du Monde, 2010)
 Circulo de La Noche (Ouest, 2015)
 Paris Seville. Bois de Guitare: Madera de Guitarra (Fremeaux, 2018)

References

External links
 Raphaël Faÿs official site
 Biography and discography

1959 births
French jazz guitarists
French male guitarists
Gypsy jazz guitarists
Living people
French male jazz musicians